Space Age Whiz Kids is a song by Joe Walsh, the guitarist for the Eagles. It was released as a lead single from his sixth studio solo album, You Bought It – You Name It, being Walsh's eleventh single.

Meaning
The song was written during the latter part of the 1980s video arcade craze, and its lyrics are a personal commentary, critical of then-modern American culture against Walsh's older pinball and pool generation. The lyrics also reflect a satirical view on this, with lines such as: "I feel a little bit mixed up, maybe I'm obsolete".

Promotional video
The music video starts out in an old-fashioned arcade in black and white. Walsh, pushes his way up to a pinball machine. The video then turns to colour - depicting that he's in the present. Now, there's a bunch of video games instead of pinball machines, Walsh tries to talk to the kids sitting around but they ignore him. They show the old pinball arcade and everyone is covered with cobwebs. Here are scenes of Walsh and his band where Walsh is dressed in a jumpsuit with sunglasses and an Indian-style headband with a feather on the side. He and his band are on white circular platforms in the middle of blackness. Towards the end, Walsh walks through the futuristic arcade in a full-blown space suit. With someone chanting "I like Space Age Whiz Kids" is on a floating video game screen that flies around the arcade. The closing shot is of a video game entitled "Whiz Kids".

Track listing
'''7" Single (Warner Bros. Records – 7-29611, Warner Bros. Records – 9 29611-7, Full Moon – 7-29611, Full Moon – 9 29611-7)
A "Space Age Whiz Kids" – 3:40  
B "Theme from Island Weirdos" – 3:13

Chart performance
"Space Age Whiz Kids" peaked at #52 on the US, Hot 100

References

External links
 

Joe Walsh songs
1983 singles
1983 songs
Songs written by Joe Walsh
Song recordings produced by Bill Szymczyk
Songs written by Joe Vitale (musician)
Full Moon Records singles
Warner Records singles